Play God is an album by the American band Reverend, released in 1991. It was Reverend's second (and last) full-length release. Play God marked the departure of bassist Dennis O'Hara and drummer Rick Basha, who were replaced by Angelo Espino and Jason Ian, respectively. The album includes a cover of Creedence Clearwater Revival's "Fortunate Son".

Critical reception

The Chicago Tribune wrote that Wayne "screeches like a metal queen rather than the growly thrasher he wishes he were."

AllMusic wrote that, "under Rosen, Reverend sounded cleaner and more polished, but the heaviness and aggression remained."

Track listing

Personnel
David Wayne: vocals
Brian Korban: guitar
Angelo Espino: bass
Jason Ian: drums

Additional members
Tommy Verdonck: additional lead guitar
Juan Garcia: backing vocals

References

Reverend (band) albums
1991 albums
Charisma Records albums